Victor Luis Chuab Zamblauskas (born 23 June 1993), known as Victor Luis, is a Brazilian footballer who plays as a left-back for Coritiba.

Club career
Born in São Paulo, Victor Luis joined Palmeiras' youth categories in 2003, aged ten, after starting it out at Portuguesa. He progressed through the former's youth setup, always as a first-choice.

In July 2012 Victor Luis moved abroad for the first time in his career, after agreeing to a one-year loan deal at Porto B. On 12 August he made his professional debut, starting in a 2–2 away draw against Tondela in the Segunda Liga; he scored his first goal late in the month, netting a last-minute equalizer in a 1–1 draw at Portimonense through a free kick.

In June 2013 Victor Luis returned to Verdão, after appearing in 18 matches for Porto B. He was promoted to the main squad by manager Gilson Kleina, but was never used during the campaign, which ended in promotion.

Victor Luis made his Palmeiras debut on 9 March 2014, replacing Bruno César in the 64th minute of a 3–1 away win against Paulista. He made his Série A debut on 18 May, again from the bench in a 1–0 success at Vitória.

Victor Luis signed a new deal with the club on 30 July, running until 2017. He scored his first goal for Palmeiras on 17 September, netting the last of a 2–2 home draw against Flamengo.

The player has Lithuanian ancestry, so Brazilian media site spread rumors that he could choose to play for the Lithuanian national football team, then coached by Edgaras Jankauskas. The media claimed that the coach had already contacted the player about this option.

Honours
Palmeiras
Campeonato Brasileiro Série B: 2013
Campeonato Brasileiro Série A: 2018
Campeonato Paulista: 2020
Copa Libertadores: 2021

Individual
Campeonato Paulista Team of the year: 2018

References

External links
Palmeiras official profile 

1993 births
Living people
Footballers from São Paulo
Brazilian people of Lithuanian descent
Brazilian footballers
Association football defenders
Campeonato Brasileiro Série A players
Campeonato Brasileiro Série B players
Sociedade Esportiva Palmeiras players
Ceará Sporting Club players
Botafogo de Futebol e Regatas players
Coritiba Foot Ball Club players
Liga Portugal 2 players
FC Porto B players
Brazilian expatriate footballers
Brazilian expatriate sportspeople in Portugal
Expatriate footballers in Portugal